Robert Schwartz may refer to:

 Robert Schwartz (water polo) (born 1939), South African Olympic water polo player
 Robert A. Schwartz (born 1947), American physician
 Bobby Schwartz (Robert Benjamin Schwartz, born 1956), American motorcycle speedway racer
 Robert Towne (Robert Bertram Schwartz, born 1934), American screenwriter and director
 Robert J. Schwartz, stockbroker founded Economists for Peace and Security, an NGO
 Bob Schwartz (Robert Risdon Schwartz, born 1950), American healthcare executive in Tennessee
 Robert S. Schwartz, American orthopedic footwear specialist and CEO
 Robert Schwartz, American designer of the M65 Atomic Cannon
 Robert Schwartz, an American scientist murdered by his daughter in 2001

See also
 Robert Schwarz (disambiguation)
 Robert Schwartzman